Bumthang Valley  is the main inhabited valley in the Bumthang district of Bhutan.

History 

Bumthang is one of the most beautiful and sacred valleys in Bhutan.

The main town in the valley is Jakar. Bhutan's only brewery, brewing Red Panda wheat beer, is in Jakar. 

Bumthang is divided into four gewogs, namely Chhoekhor, Tang, Chhume and Ura.

The valley is broad with various habitats including coniferous woodland.

The language spoken in Bumthang is known as Bumthangkha, a Tibeto-Burman language. Each of the four valleys of Bumthang has its own dialect.

References 

Valleys of Bhutan